Gilbert Walker (15 February 1888 – 8 May 1952) was an English cricketer.  Walker was a right-handed batsman.  He was born at Olton, Warwickshire.

Walker made a single first-class appearance for Warwickshire against Sussex at Edgbaston in the 1912 County Championship.  Sussex made 151 in their first-innings and in response Warwickshire made 257 in their first-innings, with Walker being dismissed for a duck by Harry Simms.  Sussex made 150 in their second-innings, leaving Warwickshire with a target of 45.  Walker had batted at number eight in the first-innings, but was promoted to open the batting, scoring 13 runs before he was dismissed by Simms.  Despite this, Warwickshire won the match by 6 wickets.  This was his only major appearance for Warwickshire.

He died at Werribee, Victoria, Australia in 1952.

References

External links
Gilbert Walker at ESPNcricinfo
Gilbert Walker at CricketArchive

1888 births
1952 deaths
People from Olton
English cricketers
Warwickshire cricketers